Autonomy is an extended play released by British blues rock band, Drenge. The extended play was released on 5 October 2018 through Infectious, in between their second and third studio albums, Undertow and Strange Creatures, respectively.

Track listing

Critical reception 

Autonomy received general positive reviews from contemporary music critics. On review aggregator website, Album of the Year, the album has an average rating of 73 out of 100 based on three critic reviews.

Personnel
Drenge
Eoin Loveless – lead vocals, guitar
Rory Loveless – drums
Rob Graham – bass guitar

References

External links 
 
 
 Autonomy at Rough Trade

2018 EPs
Drenge (band) albums
Infectious Music albums
Rough Trade Records EPs
BMG Rights Management albums